Pectis elongata, the tropical cinchweed, is a summer blooming annual plant of the genus Pectis, found in the West Indies as well as in South and Central America. Tropical cinchweed is burned as a mosquito repellent.

References

elongata
Flora of the Caribbean
Flora of South America
Flora of Central America
Flora without expected TNC conservation status